"Shock Horror" is the second single released by Scottish band The View, from their second album Which Bitch?. The B-side on the CD release is "My Mother". The song was available in MP3 format from 5 December 2008, when the 7" was pre-ordered from the band's official website.

The video for the song was released in December 2008. The song received better airplay than the previous single "5Rebbeccas" did, but it performed even worse than its predecessor, charting only at No. 64 in the UK Singles Chart before dropping to No. 94 in its second week.

Track listing
UK CD
 "Shock Horror" - 4:08
 "My Mother" - 5:03

Band members
Kieren Webster - Bass guitar
Pete Reilly - Lead guitarist
Kyle Falconer - Lead singer, rhythm guitarist, piano
Steve Morrison - Drums

External links
The View's Official Website

References

2009 singles
The View (band) songs
2008 songs
Songs written by Kyle Falconer
Songs written by Kieren Webster